The Apollo asteroids are a group of near-Earth asteroids named after 1862 Apollo, discovered by German astronomer Karl Reinmuth in the 1930s. They are Earth-crossing asteroids that have an orbital semi-major axis greater than that of the Earth (a > 1 AU) but perihelion distances less than the Earth's aphelion distance (q < 1.017 AU).

, the number of known Apollo asteroids is 17,540, making the class the largest group of near-Earth objects (cf. the Aten, Amor and Atira asteroids), of which 1,571 are numbered (asteroids are not numbered until they have been observed at two or more oppositions), and 1,976 are identified as potentially hazardous asteroids.

The closer their semi-major axis is to Earth's, the less eccentricity is needed for the orbits to cross. The Chelyabinsk meteor, that exploded over the city of Chelyabinsk in the southern Urals region of Russia on February 15, 2013, injuring an estimated 1,500 people with flying glass from broken windows, was an Apollo-class asteroid.

List 
The largest known Apollo asteroid is 1866 Sisyphus, with a diameter of about 8.5 km. Examples of known Apollo asteroids include:

See also 
 Alinda group
 Amor asteroid
 Apollo asteroids (category)
 Apollo asteroid records
 Aten asteroid
 List of minor planets
2020 PP1

References

External links 
 List of Apollo minor planets

 
Apollo